Alatskivi Parish was a rural municipality in Tartu County, Estonia.

Settlements

International relations

Twin towns — Sister cities
Alatskivi Parish was twinned with:
 Kävlinge Municipality, Sweden
 Muurame Municipality, Finland

See also
Alatskivi Castle

References

External links